Muriel Robb defeated Agnes Morton 6–2, 6–4 in the All Comers' Final, and then defeated the reigning champion Charlotte Sterry 7–5, 6–1 in the challenge round to win the ladies' singles tennis title at the 1902 Wimbledon Championships, after their first match was abandoned at 4–6, 13–11 due to rain.

Draw

Challenge round

All comers' finals

Top half

Bottom half

References

External links

Ladies' Singles
Wimbledon Championship by year – Women's singles
Wimbledon Championships - Singles
Wimbledon Championships - Singles